The autochthonous theory about the origin of the Bulgarians is an alternative to the official Bulgarian historiography, which dates chronologically from the 19th century.

Emergence and development 

Bulgarian clergyman Spiridon Gabrovski completed in 1792 a "Short history of the Bulgarian Slavic people". Spiridon approached the so-called Illyrism, which declares the ancient Illyrians to be early Slavs. Spiridon tried to legitimize the Bulgarians ("Illyrians") through Alexander the Great, presented entirely in a positive light. Georgi Rakovski, one of the first Bulgarian national activists, coined in 1860s the theory, to that the Bulgarians were an autochthonous population on the Balkans, known to the ancient writers as Thracians. This historiographical concept was exposited scientifically for the first time in 1910 in the book "The Origin of the Bulgarians and the beginning of the Bulgarian state and the Bulgarian church" by Gancho Tzenov. A fundamental tenet of the autochthonous theory is that the Bulgars that were actually Bulgarians are not settlers in Europe, but people who have inhabited the Balkans since antiquity. That is, they as a people, although they had different names in different historical epochs, are actually direct descendants of indigenous tribes such as Thracians, Illyrians, Macedones, Getae etc., who lived on the same territory. 

This theory, though denied and rejected as a marginal one, has its supporters and theorists in its various variations today as Georgi Rakovski and Gancho Tsenov have been rediscovered. Their theories have been updated as an alternative to the accepted migration theories.  One of them establishes a complete continuity between ancient Balkan populations and modern Bulgarians. Thracians are considered simply ancestors of the modern Bulgarians and their continuity is projected to the prehistoric times. Generally, proponents of Thracomania assume that the Thracians and Bulgarians are the same people, and that therefore the descended from the Thracians must be in fact Bulgarians. In another version of these hypotheses it is assumed that the Bulgars, who were Thracians, after a long journey from the Balkans to Central Asia in classical Antiquity, have returned to their native homeland in the early Middle ages. 

Some modern Bulgarian researchers have attempted to prove the deception that the "Ezerovo ring" inscription, written with Greek letters in the Thracian language, is in fact in Slavic language, close to modern Bulgarian and that it was not the Greek alphabet, but the original script of the ancient Thracians. During the 2000s the Macedonian Academy of Sciences and Arts, has promoted the similar idea that a "Demotic Egyptian" script on Rosetta stone is written in Slavic language close to modern Macedonian and that was the language of the ancient Macedonians.

See also
 Genetic studies on Bulgarians
 Bulgarian ethnogenesis
 Ancient Macedonism
 Protochronism

References

Pseudohistory
Fringe theories
Historiography of Bulgaria